Hasan Abad ( – ), also spelled Hasanabad, is an old and historical area within the Monirie District of Tehran, Iran. There is also a famous square in the area which carries the same name.

History

The area was originally developed during the reign of the Qajar dynasty.

Hasanabad Square was built by the order of Mirza Yusef Ashtiani, the vizier of Naser ed Din Shah, and was named after his son, Mirza Hasan Ashtiani, who then became the Prime Minister of Iran for a period.

Following the 1979 Revolution, the square was renamed to The 31st of Shahrivar, in commemoration of the invasion of Iraqi bombers to the Iranian air bases. However, the new name did not remain and it has been reverted to Hasan Abad.

Once there was a statue at the square, which represented the Qajar-era constitutional activist Malek ol Motekallemin. After the 1979 Revolution, for unspecified reasons, the statue was moved to the store of the City's Park and then completely disappeared.

Structure

The surrounding buildings of Hasanabad Square were designed by Iranian-Armenian architect Qelich Baqelian, with the structural engineering provided by fellow Iranian-Armenian architect Leon Tadosian.

The square is surrounded by four identical buildings, each covering one corner of the square. After the 1979 Revolution, the Iranian Cultural Heritage Organization made efforts in order to re-construct the damaged portions of the buildings. As part of the reconstruction, two additional blue glassy modern floors owned by the National Bank of Iran were added onto the old structure of one of the four buildings.

Gallery

References

See also
 Toopkhaneh
 National Garden, Tehran
 Ferdows Garden
 Museum of the Qasr Prison

Squares in Tehran
Buildings and structures in Tehran

it:Hasanabad